The Orlican VT-16 Orlik is a single-seat club glider, serving Czech gliding clubs and setting several national records in the early 1960s.

Design and development
The VT-16 Orlik was designed by Jiri Matejček and is a high-wing monoplane of all-wood construction, except that the skin is stabilized with polystyrene foam. Its wing has a single spar structure with a forward torsion box; the whole wing is plywood skinned and foam filled, allowing the ribs to be comparatively widely spaced.  In plan it is straight-tapered with blunt tips; there are 3° of dihedral.  It has conventional plain ailerons and spoilers at mid-chord, which extend both above and below the wing.  At the time of its first flight in August 1959 it was a Standard Class glider with a  span.  Later aircraft had  and  spans but it was the 16 m version that went into series production.

The fuselage of the Orlik is a semi-monocoque of deep oval cross-section, tapering to the tail.  The single-seat cockpit, placed just ahead of the wing, is covered by a side-hinged blown canopy.  Its tail is conventional with a straight-edged, ply-covered and foam-filled all-moving tailplane, fitted with an anti-balance tab, mounted on top of the fuselage and ahead of the small fin which is constructed in the same way. The fabric-covered, balanced rudder is broad and taller than the fin, reaching down to the keel. Overall, the vertical tail has almost upright straight edges and a blunt tip.  The Orlik has a fixed, semi-recessed monowheel ahead of the wing leading edge, assisted by a small tail bumper.

Operational history
25 VT-16 Orliks were produced in the first series production run, going to Czech gliding clubs.  The Orlik also set several new Czech national gliding records during 1962. 15 VT-16s and 48 VT-116s remain on the Czech civil aircraft register in 2010, though some are disassembled.

Variants
VT-16 Orlik about 25 built.
VT-116 Orlik II more than 50 built.

Aircraft on display

Prague Aviation Museum, Kbely: Orlik I OE-2408

Specifications (VT-16)

See also

References

1950s Czechoslovakian sailplanes
High-wing aircraft
Aircraft first flown in 1959